The Ghana School Feeding Programme (GSFP) is a pilot project to provide food to children at school. It is run by the GSFP Secretariat in partnership with international agencies including the World Bank, the World Food Programme, the Partnership for Child Development and UNICEF, as well as national organizations including Canadian International Development Agency (CIDA), the US Agency for International Development (USAID) and the Dutch embassy.

References

Education in Ghana